Oleh Anatoliyovych Lutkov (born 15 May 1966 in Zaporizhzhia, Ukraine) is a Ukrainian football coach and former goalkeeper. He is currently in charge of PFC Sumy.

External links
Profile on official Metalurh Zaporizhzhia website 
Oleg Lutkov at Footballdatabase

1966 births
Living people
Footballers from Zaporizhzhia
Soviet footballers
Ukrainian footballers
Pakhtakor Tashkent FK players
FC Zvezda Irkutsk players
FC Torpedo Zaporizhzhia players
SC Olkom Melitopol players
FC Metalurh Zaporizhzhia players
FC Viktor Zaporizhzhia players
FC Kryvbas Kryvyi Rih players
Ukrainian Premier League managers
FC Metalurh Zaporizhzhia managers
FC Arsenal Bila Tserkva managers
FC Tytan Armyansk managers
NK Veres Rivne managers
PFC Sumy managers
FC Ihroservice Simferopol managers
FC Krymteplytsia Molodizhne managers
Association football goalkeepers
Ukrainian football managers